This is the list of the top 50 albums of 2003 in New Zealand.

Chart

Key
 – Album of New Zealand origin

External links
 The Official NZ Music Chart, RIANZ website

2003 in New Zealand music
2003 record charts
Albums 2003